Jelena Jovčić is a Serbian documentary filmmaker.

Biography
Jovčić  sometimes takes on a number of roles when she produces documentaries and promo films. She could be either a director, cinematographer, or editor.

She is an associate of the Ethnographic Museum in Belgrade on projects in the areas of documentary film and, over the last four years, has been the editor of the International Film Festival of Ethnological Film.

Recognition
In 2007, Jovčić was part of a select group of eight(8) Serbian filmmakers whose works were screened at the Avalon Theatre, Washington, DC, USA.

References

External links
10th Dortmund International Film Festival
Festival of Austrian Film,Graz, April 2008.

Living people
Serbian filmmakers
Year of birth missing (living people)